Daemonica is a 3D action-adventure game with RPG elements that was developed by Czech companies RA Images and Cinemax. The game is divided into 5 acts. Cinemax and RA Images planned a sequel to the game but it was cancelled.

Plot 
Daemonica tells a story of Haresh al-Dorem, the beast hunter, who is known as Nicholas Farepoynt. In the prologue, the player finds out that Nicholas was born as Nicholas Mortimer a son of Roger Mortimer and queen Isabella. who were responsible for the death of King Edward II of England. When Mortimer was executed, Nicholas was sent to a church in France and was renamed Farepoynt.  He later became a mercenary and joined the English army in the Hundred Years' War. When he returned to England he met Clarice, a beast hunter. Beast hunters hunt serial killers and other "human beasts". They have knowledge of an ancient language of Daemonica. It allows them to call a demon Dahn-en-nyan the soul bearer who can help them to talk with the dead if they know certain facts about the dead. Hunters can also call a demon Marghet-en-dryat who can bring the dead back but there is no known case of a hunter surviving the ritual. Clarice taught Nicholas until they worked on a case in York. Clarice made a mistake that cost her life. Nicholas then received a letter from a Mayor of the small town of Cavorn where a couple had disappeared.

The game starts as Nicholas gets near Cavorn. He finds out that a murder occurred in the meantime but the only suspect was already executed on the orders of the Mayor. Nicholas starts to investigate and proves that the executed person was innocent for which he earns trust from citizens but hatred from the mayor. He also meets Helen, the beautiful young wife of the mayor and starts to have feelings for her.

During his investigation another person comes to Cavorn - Fabius. Fabius tries to convince Nicholas to leave but he rejects. Nicholas eventually finds out that all murders and disappearances are caused by a demon locked in a Crypt of local monastery and Fabius is a member of society that tries to make it secret. Nicholas is then poisoned by the Mayor who is revealed to be controlled by the demon. Nicholas survives but he finds Helen killed and tries to resurrect her but the ritual looks as if not working. Nicholas then goes to the crypt where Fabius reveals that in fact he tries to release to demon to control him to use him for good. He also tries to convince Nicholas to help him. The player has to make a decision.

If he decides to help Fabius, the demon is pulled into Fabius who then returns to Rome where he helps to make the Church stronger as new crusades across the world are led. The live in Cavorns go on peacefully as no-one notices the shadow that will swallow all.

If the player refuses to help Fabius, Nicholas kills him and the demon tries to control him  but is saved by Helen who pulls the demon into her. She says Nicholas that she is a daughter of Yerik whose blood is unbearable to the demon which helps her control him. Nicholas is not truly convinced if he should trust her so the player has to make decision once again.

If he decides to trust her they live happily together and Nicholas can have a normal life thanks to her. It is not sure if she will be able to hold the demon forever to protect the world or if he will get a control over her one day.

If the player kills her the world is saved but Nicholas loses any chance of getting a normal life. He leaves the town and continues as a Beast Hunter. The folks of Cavorn have been since then lighting up tho candles for Nicholas and Helen followed by prayer for Nicholas's soul.

Development 
The game was announced by software studio RA Images in January 2005. It was the first video game project of the studio. The game was scheduled for release in Q1 2005.

The game was released in the Czech Republic in May 2005. It was published by Cinemax that also codeveloped the game. In 2006 the game was published in North America by Meridian4.

Reception 

The game has received mostly mixed reviews from critics.

Sequel 
In December 2008 Cinemax announced that Legends of Daemonca: Fareypoint Purgatory is in development. It was supposed to be a sequel to the original Daemonica. Player would control Nicholas Fareypoint the protagonist of Daemonica as he arrives on a mysterious island. His goal is to escape from this island. The game was later cancelled.

References 

2005 video games
Action-adventure games
Point-and-click adventure games
Video games developed in the Czech Republic
Detective video games
Fantasy video games set in the Middle Ages
Dark fantasy video games
Video games set in England
Video games about demons
Horror video games
Windows games
Windows-only games
Single-player video games
3D GameStudio games
Meridian4 games